Rajakumari is a 1947 Indian Tamil language film directed by A. S. A. Sami, starring M. G. Ramachandran (credited as Ramachandar) and K. Malathi. It was released on 11 April 1947.

Plot

Cast 

Male cast
 M. G. Ramachandar as Sukumar
 T. S. Balaiah as Aalahalan
 M. R. Swaminathan as the sorcerer
 S. V. Subbaiah as Mallika's father
 M. N. Nambiar as Bahu
 Pulimoottai Ramasami as the sorcerer's disciple
 T. E. Ramasamy Iyer as the sorcerer's disciple
 M. R. Madhavan as Nallan
 Narayana Pillai as Paambaatti

Female cast
 K. Malathi as Mallika
 K. Thavamani Devi as Visharani
 M. Sivabhagyam as Bahuni
 M. M. Radha Bai as Sukumar's mother
C. K. Saraswathi as Anjalai
 R. Malathi as a dancer

Production 
Jupiter Pictures partner Somu asked A. S. A. Sami to create a screenplay that he himself could direct with artistes on the payroll of the company. However, when he read Sami's screenplay, he suggested that P. U. Chinnappa and T. R. Rajakumari, who were in the forefront at that time, play the lead roles. But Sami requested Somu to stick to the original decision. M. G. Ramachandran (then credited as Ramachandar) and Malathi were asked to play the lead roles. After more than half the film was shot, the company's other partner S. K. Mohideen felt the project be abandoned. Somu weighed the consequences in the light of future career of Sami and Ramachandar. He told his partner that a decision could be taken on completion of the film.

Rajakumari was Ramachandar's 15th film and first film as leading actor. Sami arranged for a wrestler called Kamaludeen to participate in a fight sequence for the film. But Ramachandar insisted to have Sandow M. M. A. Chinnappa Thevar who had been acting in small roles to do the role. At first director was not interested to have him in the film, but later agreed. K. Thavamani Devi who was a talented dancer and singer played the role of a vamp. At one point she came for shooting wearing a dress with a plunging neckline (something unseen those days). It caused ripples on the set.

Soundtrack 
Music was composed by S. M. Subbaiah Naidu, while the lyrics were penned by Udumalai Narayana Kavi.

Reception 

Rajakumari turned out to be a commercial success with huge profits, claims Ramachandran's fans. However, there is no visible record for the film's run or its profit, whatsoever. In 2008, film historian Randor Guy, an ardent fan of Ramachandran himself said it would be "Remembered for: the debut of M. G. Ramachandran as hero and A. S. A. Sami as director.

References

External links 

1940s historical films
1940s Tamil-language films
1947 films
Films scored by S. M. Subbaiah Naidu
Indian black-and-white films
Indian historical films
Jupiter Pictures films